The Howl is a 1970 Italian comedy film directed by Tinto Brass. It was entered into the 20th Berlin International Film Festival.

Cast
 Tina Aumont - Anita
 Gigi Proietti - Coso
 Nino Segurini - Berto Bertuccioli
 Germano Longo
 Giorgio Gruden - Night watchman
 Osiride Pevarello - Cannibal philosopher
 Attilio Corsini
 Carla Cassola
 Sam Dorras - Priest
 Tino Scotti - Intellectual at school
 Edoardo Florio - Diogenes

References

External links

1970 films
1970 comedy films
Italian comedy films
1970s Italian-language films
Films directed by Tinto Brass
Films scored by Fiorenzo Carpi
1970s Italian films